Thelma Coyne and Nancye Wynne successfully defended their title for a fourth consecutive year, defeating May Hardcastle and Emily Hood Westacott 7–5, 6–4 in the final, to win the women's doubles tennis title at the 1939 Australian Championships.

Seeds

  Thelma Coyne /  Nancye Wynne (champions)
  Nell Hopman /  Dot Stevenson (semifinals)
  May Blick /  Margaret Wilson (semifinals)
  May Hardcastle /  Emily Hood Westacott (final)

Draw

Draw

References

External links
 Source for seedings
 Source for the draw

1939 in tennis
1939 in women's tennis
1939 in Australian women's sport
Women's Doubles